St. George Cricket Grounds or St. George Grounds is a former baseball venue located on Staten Island, New York.
 
The Cricket Grounds were also known as Mutrie's Dump or Mutrie's Dumping Grounds, referring to Jim Mutrie, manager of the Metropolitans and the Giants.

The stadium, which was built in the style of a typical horse race track grandstand, was first used as a baseball field in 1853, with the first game between the New York Knickerbockers and the Washington Club. The site later became part of the development of the then-new community of St. George, Staten Island in 1886, by Erastus Wiman. Fans were able to watch games while watching the construction of the Statue of Liberty.  Although the community and the ferry were successful, baseball was not. The Giants were a strong team through the latter part of the 1880s, and the Metropolitans folded after the 1887 season. The Giants played some games there from April 29 – June 14, 1889, while awaiting construction of the Polo Grounds; their move to Manhattan ended professional baseball at St. George.

The parking lot of the current Richmond County Bank Ballpark was the location of the former Cricket Grounds.

See also 
 Bloomingdale Park
 St George's Cricket Club
 Staten Island Cricket Club
 Van Cortlandt Park, currently used for cricket fields in New York City
 Richmond County Bank Ballpark

References

External links
New York Metropolitans Attendance, Stadiums and Park Factors page on baseball-reference.com
National League ballpark table page at  ballparks.com

St. George, Staten Island
Sports venues in Staten Island
Defunct baseball venues in the United States
Lacrosse venues in New York City
Former sports venues in New York City
Demolished sports venues in New York (state)
Demolished buildings and structures in Staten Island
Cricket grounds in New York City
Baseball venues in New York City